Carl Crispin Bradfield (born 18 January 1975) is a former South African cricketer. Bradfield is a right-handed batsman who bowls right-arm medium pace.

In a career that lasted 14 seasons, he represented Eastern Cape, Border, Warriors, Huntingdonshire, Eastern Province and Eastern Province B.

Something of a journeyman within South Africa, Bradfield did play 3 List-A matches for Huntingdonshire in English county cricket, which was his only spell with an English county.  In his 14-year career, he forged a successful, if inconsistent first-class career.  He played 93 first-class matches, where he scored 5,412 runs at a batting average of 33.20, with 29 half centuries and 9 centuries.  His highest score in first-class cricket was 196.  In List-A cricket, he played a total of 75 matches, where he scored 1,757 runs at an average of 24.74.  In the process, he made 9 half centuries and a single century high score of 109*.  He also took 4 wickets in List-A cricket, at a bowling average of 21.00 apiece.

Toward the end of his career, Twenty20 cricket was introduced, with Bradfield playing a single match in the format for Eastern Cape against Western Province Boland.

References

External links
Carl Bradfield at Cricinfo
Carl Bradfield at CricketArchive

1975 births
Living people
People from Makhanda, Eastern Cape
South African cricketers
Eastern Province cricketers
Border cricketers
Warriors cricketers
Huntingdonshire cricketers
Cricketers from the Eastern Cape